Erwin Leo Himmel (born April 9, 1956 in Graz, Austria) is an Austrian automobile designer. He was one of the first designers who recognized the future importance of a consistent brand design in the automotive industry.

Background

Born as the second of two sons in 1956, Erwin Leo Himmel grew up in Leibnitz, Austria. After finishing high school, he started to study architecture at the Graz University of Technology. In the second year of his studies, he read an article about automobile design, where he recognized the existence of the profession of an automobile designer. While studying further he taught himself to sketch cars by copying drawings he found in magazines. He trained himself for more than one year and became freer and freer in his style. After preparing a portfolio of his own designs, he applied for a job as an automobile designer in Germany. Getting accepted by Audi, Ford, and Volkswagen, Himmel decided to quit his studies and took the job at Audi. The former chief designer of Audi Hartmut Warkuss saw his talent and potential immediately and offered him a scholarship for the Royal College of Art in London, the international elite college in design. Himmel attended the full two-year master program and graduated in 1981 as ‘Master of Design’. These years in London, where he got to know people such as Raymond Loewy, were one of the most influencing times in his life.

Automotive design

Audi, 1982–1994

After graduating he came back to the design centre of Audi in Ingolstadt, Germany, and started his career. Himmel was responsible for virtually the entire range of models from the mid-1980s to the mid-1990s, like the Audi 80 Sedan, Avant, Coupe and Cabriolet, Audi 100 Sedan and Avant, and the Audi V8. In this creative environment he enjoyed working together with other designers such as J Mays and Peter Schreyer. In 1990, he became Director of Audi’s Munich-based design studio where he had the idea to develop a new concept. A design icon was born: the Audi Quattro Spyder, the highlight of the “Frankfurt IAA” in 1991 and a milestone in the design history of Audi.

Design Centre Europe, 1995–1999

In 1994, Erwin Leo Himmel realizing the establishment of the first external design centre of the whole Volkswagen Group in Europe. After a long process of searching, the strategic choice of location fell on Barcelona, Spain. A suitable piece of land was found in Sitges, a seaside town next to Barcelona. Himmel was responsible for the planning and realization of the newly built 130-people design facility, which was named “DCE – Design Centre Europe”. He worked there for Audi, Volkswagen, SEAT and Skoda. Such successful designs as the Audi A8, S3 and RS4, and Volkswagen Touareg, Touran and essential parts of Golf IV and Phaeton were created.

Fuore Design, 2000–2007

At the end of 1999, Himmel was offered the position of chief designer at Skoda, but he decided instead to start his own business. And so he founded the independent 35-people design studio “Fuore Design” in the heart of Barcelona. Beside the core business of automotive design, he specialized in brand consulting.

He consulted Mitsubishi in their process of finding a new design language, and created the two concept cars, the Mitsubishi Pajero Evolution and Pajero Evolution 2+2, which were presented at the 2001 “Frankfurt IAA” and the 2002 “Geneva Salon International de l’Auto”. After the great feedback at the shows, Himmel was also responsible for the design development of the Dakar Rally multiple-champion racing car Mitsubishi Pajero Evolution.

Subaru had a strategic relationship with Fuore. Himmel developed a new brand design strategy. His concept car Subaru B11S showed the new philosophy at the 2003 “Geneva Salon International de l’Auto”. The current models Subaru R1, R2 and B9 Tribeca were created by him, too. With the ‘XF 10’ and the ‘BlackJag’, Himmel presented his first self-developed show cars at the 2003 “Barcelona Salón Internacional del Automóvil” and the 2004 “Geneva Salon International de l’Auto”. Himmel worked for almost every leading corporate group in the automotive sector. After a hard year in 2006 and a bad forecast of incoming contracts in 2007, Himmel did not see a good enough economic perspective to continue and decided to sell the company at the middle of 2007.

Hispano Suiza Automobilmanufaktur AG, from 2008

After selling Fuore Design in 2007, Erwin Leo Himmel dedicated himself to his dream goal of owning his own car brand in the luxury segment. After years of research and his activities in Barcelona, he noticed the historic automobile brand Hispano Suiza. Since the brand became free after decades of inactivity, Erwin Leo Himmel registered this brand and brought it back to life.

In 2019 Erwin Leo Himmel expanded Hispano Suiza with its own division for alternative drive technologies in the hydrogen sector. Since then, this department has been developing a further vehicle model with a hydrogen drive in addition to the conventional model with a combustion engine.

Bankruptcy
In February 2022 the Hispano Suiza Engineering GmbH, of which Mr. Himmel was the Managing Director, declared bankruptcy with total debts of € 4,7 Mio. against estimated assets of € 42.800.

Industrial design

In his time at Fuore, Himmel made a lot of industrial design, too. Panasonic signed a strategic relationship with Fuore. Out of it, Himmel created such things as a cell-phone, an mp3-player, a home cinema system, a telephone, an air conditioner and other white goods for Panasonic. He also worked for companies such as LG and Samsung. Another field was transportation design, especially the exterior and interior design of trains. For example, Himmel developed the design of a new high-speed train for Talgo. He also designed interiors of airplanes. His ‘biggest’ project was a cruise liner for an American ocean carrier. Furthermore, he also did a lot of work in the motorcycle industry. He designed nearly every kind of size, from the scooter up to the superbike, including the development of a new design language for the world’s biggest motorcycle producer Honda. A great pleasure for him was the work for the luxury industry, especially for TAG Heuer. Moreover, he designed a bath ceramic series, for example for Roca.

All these products gave Himmel the chance to broaden his horizon in design and marketing, concerning new markets, customers and their mentalities. With the new impressions, it was also possible for him to optimize the processes in the design development, including a faster and more efficient way in automobile design.

Miscellaneous

 His brother is the Austrian court counsellor Dipl.-Ing. Dr. Wilhelm A. Himmel.
 Himmel’s motto is: “Design is my passion – Visions are my driving force.”
 During his architecture studies in Graz, Himmel played basketball in the national league of Austria. Until today he is a big basketball fan.
 Himmel is visiting professor of the Graz University of Applied Sciences.
 Himmel was the initiator and curator of “Auto Art”, a unique exhibition of show cars in Graz in 2003. “Auto Art” was one of the highlights of the cultural program of “Graz –European Capital of Culture 2003”.
 Himmel was elected one of the most famous Styrian people.

“Auto”-biography

Concept cars

Notes

References
 Car Styling (Japan), Summer 1983, no. 43, pp. 52–57
 Profile (Netherlands), November 1983, no. 4, pp. 26–31
 Auto Bild (Germany), September 16, 1991, no. 38, pp. 8/9
 Auto Motor und Sport (Germany), September 20, 1991, no. 20, pp. 26–28
 Kurier (Austria), July 4, 1997, p. 5
 Car Styling (Japan), July 7, 2001, no. 143, pp. 68–75
 La Vanguardia (Spain), May 28, 2002, no. 43306, p. 83
 Auto Revue (Austria), September 2002, no. 9, pp. 78–80
 Süddeutsche Zeitung (Germany), June 7, 2003, no. 130, p. V1
 Automobil Revue (Switzerland), June 26, 2003, no. 26, p. 19
 Autotrends (China), December 2003, no. 96, pp. 102–105
 Auto Focus (Germany), May/June 2004, no. 3, pp. 70 – 75

External links
 Member of the jury of the Austrian Design Award
 Design hall of fame
 Auto Art Graz 2003
 Auto Art pictures
 Mitsubishi Pajero Dakar fact sheet
 Article in "Welt"
 Barcelona Motor Show 2003
 Famous Styrian people
Hispano Suiza - Maguari

1956 births
Austrian automobile designers
Living people
Volkswagen Group designers